"It Ain't Nothin'" is a song written by Tony Haselden, and recorded by American country music artist Keith Whitley.  It was posthumously released in October 1989 as the second single from the album I Wonder Do You Think of Me.  His fifth and last No. 1 on the Billboard Hot Country Singles chart, the song was his second posthumous chart-topper, reaching the top of the chart seven months after his death.

The song spent one week at No. 1 and 17 weeks in the Hot Country Singles chart's top 40.

Music video
A music video was released of the song, and has aired on The Nashville Network, CMT and Great American Country. The music video shows pictures a la Knots Landing fashion and are a montage of Whitley throughout his life, from early childhood through shortly before his death.

Chart performance

Year-end charts

References

1989 singles
Keith Whitley songs
Song recordings produced by Garth Fundis
RCA Records singles
Songs written by Tony Haselden
Songs released posthumously
1989 songs